is a Japanese actor and voice actor. Until January 19, 2007, he was known by his birth name. He belonged to Stardust Promotion until the end of May 2015. He is best known for portraying Kouga Saejima/GARO, the title character from the Japanese tokusatsu television series GARO from 2005 to 2006, its 2010 film adaptation, Garo: Red Requiem, and the 2011 television series Garo: Makai Senki (which serves as a sequel to the original series).

Filmography

PV (Promotional Video)
2003 Kou Shibasaki 「nemurenai yoru nemuranai yume」　
2004 Ruppina 「in the name of love」

Movies
2004 Toshio no Heya
2006 Luna Heights 2 | Runa haitsu 2
2008 Heibon Ponch (Good-looking Mashima)
2008 Triple Complex Returns
2009 Hijoshi Zukan (Actor#2)
2009 Hana Guerilla (Yusuke)
2010 Garo: Red Requiem .... Kouga Saejima/GARO
2013 Garo: Soukoku no Maryu .... Kouga Saejima/GARO

TV drama
2003 Modoken Quill no Issho
2003 Victory! Futto Girls no Seishun
2005 GARO .... Kouga Saejima/GARO
2006 Komyo ga Tsuji (Takenaka Kyuusaku)
2006 Garo Special: Byakuya no Maju .... Kouga Saejima/GARO
2007 Koibana
2009 LOVE GAME (Shinozaki)
2011 Garo: Makai Senki .... Kouga Saejima/GARO

Anime television series (Voice acting roles)
2004 School Rumble (Ōji Karasuma)
2005 Sugar Sugar Rune (Pierre, Glace)
2006 G-9 (3-5-10/Sa-go-juu)

Theatre
The Prince of Tennis Musical (Shinji Ibu)
Hunter x Hunter Play (Kuroro Lucifer)
2007 The Light in the Piazza (Fabrizio Naccarelli)
2007–2009 Les Misérables (Marius)
2011 Dracula (Jonathan Harker)
2013 Piaf (Charles Aznavour)
2013 Next to Normal (Gabe)
2014 Thrill Me (Richard Loeb)
2017–2020 Frankenstein (Henry Clerval Dupre, Monster)
2019 Natasha, Pierre and the Great Comet of 1812 (Anatole Kuragin)
2021 Musical GOYA

Video game
Dragon Quest Swords: The Masked Queen and the Tower of Mirrors (Dean)

External links
Official blog 
 

1982 births
Living people
Former Stardust Promotion artists
Japanese male television actors
Japanese male voice actors
Male voice actors from Tokyo
21st-century Japanese male actors